"Jigga Jigga!" is a single by German hard dance band Scooter. Released December 8, 2003, the song was subsequently included on the album Mind the Gap.

Track listing
CD Maxi / Download
 "Jigga Jigga! (Radio Edit)" – 3:55
 "Jigga Jigga! (Clubmix)" – 7:36
 "Jigga Jigga! (Extended)" – 6:01
 "Shinjuku" – 4:02

CD Single
 "Jigga Jigga! (Radio Edit)" – 3:55
 "Jigga Jigga! (Extended Mix)" – 6:00

12"
 "Jigga Jigga! (Clubmix)" – 7:36
 "Jigga Jigga! (Extended)" – 6:01

UK CD Maxi
 "Jigga Jigga! (Radio Edit)" – 3:52
 "Jigga Jigga! (Clubmix)" – 7:33
 "Jigga Jigga! (Extended Mix)" – 5:59
 "Jigga Jigga! (Flip & Fill Remix)" – 6:12
 "Jigga Jigga! (Clubstar's Sunlight Mix)" – 6:14

UK CD Single
 "Jigga Jigga! (Radio Edit)" – 3:55
 "Nessaja (Radio Edit)" – 3:28

UK 12"
 "Jigga Jigga! (Extended Mix)" – 5:57
 "Jigga Jigga! (Club Mix)" – 7:32

UK Promo 2x12"
 "Jigga Jigga! (Extended Mix)" – 6:00
 "Jigga Jigga! (Club Mix)" – 7:34
 "Jigga Jigga! (Flip & Fill Remix)" – 6:16
 "Jigga Jigga! (Pez Tellet v Northstarz)" – 5:47
 "Jigga Jigga! (Clubstar Mix)" – 6:14

Charts

Weekly charts

Year-end charts

References

Scooter (band) songs
2003 singles
Songs written by H.P. Baxxter
Songs written by Rick J. Jordan
Songs written by Jens Thele
2003 songs